Post Card is the debut album by Mary Hopkin.  It was produced by Paul McCartney and released by Apple Records in February 1969 in the UK and in March 1969 in the US.  It reached number 3 in the UK and number 28 in the US. It also reached number 24 in Canada. The original US and Canadian versions differed from the UK version by including the hit single "Those Were the Days" instead of a cover of "Someone to Watch Over Me".

The 2010 CD reissue includes both "Those Were the Days" and "Someone to Watch Over Me", as well as four bonus tracks including "Turn! Turn! Turn!", which was the B-side of "Those Were the Days", and Hopkin's second single "Goodbye", written by McCartney and credited to Lennon-McCartney, plus four versions in Italian, Spanish, German and French of "Those Were The Days" as a digital download.

Critical reception

The album included three songs written by the folk singer Donovan, one of which, "Lord of the Reedy River", was deemed to be one of the album highlights by AllMusic critic Richie Unterberger. Rolling Stone critic John Mendelsohn regarded Hopkin's voice as being well-suited to the Donovan songs, although he considered the songs themselves to be "ponderous and over-long". Unterberger felt that the only problem with the album was that it contained too many pre-rock standards, in accordance with McCartney's tastes, which were not as well suited to Hopkin as more simple folk songs.  Mendelsohn praised McCartney’s production as much as Hopkin’s singing. The album was launched by Hopkin at the Post Office Tower, London, on 13 February 1969. McCartney attended.

Track listing

Original UK version

Personnel
 Mary Hopkin - lead vocals, background vocals, acoustic guitar (2)
 Paul McCartney - acoustic guitar (1, 8), bass (2), production
 Donovan Leitch - acoustic guitar (1, 2, 8)
 George Martin - piano (14)
 Derek Griffiths - guitar 
 Jim Rodford - bass
 Bernie Higginson - drums
 Mike Cotton - trumpet
 John Beecham - trombone
 Nick Newell - saxophone
 Richard Hewson - arrangement on "Those Were the Days" and "Goodbye"
Technical
 Geoff Emerick - production on "Fields of St. Etienne"
 Ken Scott, Geoff Emerick & Malcolm Toft - Recording Engineers

Chart positions

Album

References

External links
 

1969 debut albums
Apple Records albums
Albums produced by Paul McCartney
Albums recorded at Trident Studios
Albums recorded at Morgan Sound Studios